Yatta Constituency is an electoral constituency in Kenya. It is one of 5 constituencies in Machakos County. The constituency was established for the 1945 elections. Yatta residents elect a young energetic politician Hon. Robert Basil.

Members of Parliament

Locations and wards

References

External links 
Map of the constituency

Constituencies in Eastern Province (Kenya)
Constituencies in Machakos County
1963 establishments in Kenya
Constituencies established in 1963